Tam Hoi Lam (born 21 April 1998) is an Hong Kong female swimmer and a Hong Kong national record holder in swimming. She represented Hong Kong at the Asian Games in 2014, winning a bronze medal in the women's 4 × 100 metre medley relay and also claimed a bronze medal in the 4 × 100 metre freestyle relay during the 2018 Asian Games.

Tam Hoi Lam jointly with Stephanie Au, Chan Kin Lok and Sze Hang Yu set the national record in the women's 4 × 50 metre freestyle relay event at the 2017 Asian Indoor and Martial Arts Games when the trio claimed silver medal in the women's 4 × 50 metre freestyle relay

References 

1998 births
Living people
Hong Kong female freestyle swimmers
Swimmers at the 2014 Asian Games
Swimmers at the 2018 Asian Games
Medalists at the 2014 Asian Games
Medalists at the 2018 Asian Games
Asian Games silver medalists for Hong Kong
Asian Games bronze medalists for Hong Kong
Asian Games medalists in swimming
UBC Thunderbirds swimmers
Swimmers at the 2020 Summer Olympics
Olympic swimmers of Hong Kong
21st-century Hong Kong women